The Battle of Dhank took place in October 1870, ranging forces in support of the Omani Imam Azzan bin Qais against Turki bin Said, Sultan of Muscat. The battle was won by Turki bin Said backed by forces from Dubai, Ajman and Ras Al Khaimah as well as mounted fighters from the Na'im and Bani Qitab tribes.

Background 
Azzan bin Qais was the Imam of Oman between 1868 and 1870, having deposed Sayyid Salim bin Thuwaini. Azzan opposed the Saudi interference in the Buraimi Oasis and took control of Buraimi in 1869. Zayed bin Khalifa of Abu Dhabi (known as Zayed the Great) supported Azzan bin Qais, who paid Abu Dhabi a stipend for its defence of Buraimi, but the Sultan of Muscat, Turki bin Said, canvassed support for his cause from other Trucial Rulers. In early 1870 Turki visited Dubai with that goal in mind but, tempted though the other Trucial Sheikhs were to support Turki against Abu Dhabi's powerful leader, Zayed, and the Imam Azzan bin Qais, their support wasn’t ardent enough to back feet on the ground.

Although Azzan bin Qais saw the Ghafiri northern emirates as being Wahhabi in nature and therefore supportive of his enemies the Saudis, Sharjah actually joined the alliance between him and Abu Dhabi against Muscat’s Turki bin Said. In October 1870, Turki bin Said took his forces to the field in the Battle of Dhank supported by men from Dubai, Ajman and Ras Al Khaimah, as well as riders from the Na’im and Bani Qitab tribes, many of the Na'im at the time being settled at Dhank. The support of the Na'im was unusual in that they had traditionally been dependent on Zayed the Great - and remained so until his death in 1909.

Outcome 
Winning the battle, Turki cemented his ascendancy over Muscat and Oman. The Imam Azzan bin Qais, was eventually killed in battle at Muttrah in January 1871.

The settlement of the rule over the Sultanate of Oman did nothing to lessen the jostling of the tribes around Buraimi and Zayed bin Khalifa’s ambitions to hold the fertile oasis only grew with time. This culminated in January 1875 in a further attack by Zayed against the Na’im town of Dhank and the area south of the town, the Dhahirah, by a mounted force of 200 Manasir and Bani Hajir Bedouins. At the same time, Zayed sent a force of Manasir and Mazari against Buraimi, an act which led to the Bani Qitab applying to Dubai for assistance and a force of riders being sent from Dubai to Buraimi. This resulted in a standoff and Zayed suspended his operations against the oasis.

See also 
 History of Oman
 History of the United Arab Emirates

References 

History of Oman
History of the United Arab Emirates